Adolfo Lubnicki (born 25 July 1933 in Charata, Argentina; died 2015) was an Argentinian and later Uruguayan basketball player who competed in the 1960 Summer Olympics.

References

1933 births
2015 deaths
Argentine men's basketball players
Uruguayan men's basketball players
1959 FIBA World Championship players
Olympic basketball players of Uruguay
Basketball players at the 1955 Pan American Games
Basketball players at the 1960 Summer Olympics
Argentine emigrants to Uruguay
Pan American Games medalists in basketball
Pan American Games silver medalists for Argentina
Medalists at the 1955 Pan American Games
Sportspeople from Chaco Province